Jorge "Jordi" Llopart Ribas (5 May 1952 – 11 November 2020) was a Spanish race walker.

He competed in the 50 km event at the 1980, 1984, and 1988 Olympics and won a silver medal in 1980. The silver medal was Spain's first ever medal in athletics. Llopart was a European champion in this event in 1978.

Achievements

References

External links 

 
 Jordi Llopart in the Catalonia's Championship

1952 births
2020 deaths
Spanish male racewalkers
Athletes from Catalonia
Athletes (track and field) at the 1980 Summer Olympics
Athletes (track and field) at the 1984 Summer Olympics
Athletes (track and field) at the 1988 Summer Olympics
Olympic athletes of Spain
Olympic silver medalists for Spain
European Athletics Championships medalists
Medalists at the 1980 Summer Olympics
Olympic silver medalists in athletics (track and field)